The Ugly Duckling is an animated black-and-white cartoon released by Walt Disney in 1931 as part of the Silly Symphonies series. This cartoon was later remade into a color version released in 1939. About eight years later, in 1939, the film would be remade and would follow the original Andersen story much more faithfully. This gives The Ugly Duckling the unique distinction of being the only Silly Symphony to be made twice. This film was then sold to reach about 4,000 dollars per month at the most profit, because it slowly climbed up the scale of growth.

Plot
A hen is asleep when her eggs hatch. Six female chickens hatches to her delight. However, the last egg reveals a duckling who has gotten mixed in among the farmyard chickens. The hen and the chicks walk away from him. Despite the duckling's best attempts to fit in with his chick sisters, things don't work out. He tries to go to a dog, a cow and even a frog, but to no avail, leaving him to lament his "ugliness" after he mocks his reflection. Soon, the cow's mooing informs everyone to take shelter at once because there's a tornado coming their way. The hen and the chicks quickly run inside the hen house, but the duck has to go under the home due to them not accepting him.

However, when the hen's chicks are threatened by a waterfall, due to them being dropped off in a river after the hen house was caught up in the tornado, the little duckling swims to the rescue having gone through various debris to get to them. The hen cries out in fear for her daughters' lives. The duck gets into the hen house, but once the first tree gets through, the duck and his chick sisters are on it. He quickly tells them to run back in the hen house, saving them and a second tree comes through destroying it. This time, the duck orders his sisters to run to the fireplace blower, which he jumps on a few times to take them to safety. He is lauded as a hero by his sisters. The hen picks the duckling up, recognizing him as her son and hugs him to his delight.

Home media
The short was released on December 4, 2001, on Walt Disney Treasures: Silly Symphonies - The Historic Musical Animated Classics.

See also 
 The Ugly Duckling (1939 film)

References

External links 
 
 
 The Ugly Duckling at The Encyclopedia of Disney Animated Shorts

1931 films
1931 short films
1931 animated films
1930s American animated films
1930s animated short films
1930s English-language films
1930s Disney animated short films
American animated short films
American black-and-white films
Silly Symphonies
Films based on The Ugly Duckling
Animated films about chickens
Animated films about ducks
Animated films about children
Animated films about siblings
Animated films about families
Films set on farms
Animated films without speech
Films directed by Wilfred Jackson
Films produced by Walt Disney
Columbia Pictures short films
Columbia Pictures animated short films

Films about tornadoes